Nova Vas is a village in Croatia. It is connected by the D301 highway.

Populated places in Istria County
Italian-speaking territorial units in Croatia